The Roewe 550 is a compact car that is produced by Roewe in China, and was launched at the 2008 Beijing Motor Show. The 550 was reported to be derived from the MG Rover RDX60 project (itself based on the platform of the Rover 75) which was under development when MG Rover failed.

Overview
The car, codenamed W261 during development, is the work of a joint Anglo Chinese collaboration with ex experts of Rover, at consultancy firm Ricardo 2010 and SAIC had car development team. The 550 was previewed at the 2007 Shanghai Auto Show, in the form of the Roewe W2 concept car.

The drivetrain uses a 1.8 litre  engine based on the Rover K engine with 2.0 litre turbo diesel forecast to join the range and a choice of five speed manual, or five speed automatic transmission.

The car features a high technology interior with digital instruments (the Roewe D5 DIGI-NEXT system) and the RMI (Roewe Multimedia Interface, the predecessor of the SAIC InkaNet 3G/4G interface which was later installed in Roewe 350, Roewe 360 and MG GT) digital multimedia interactive system, a multi functional audio and video entertainment system with Bluetooth hands free system, USB interface and GPS.

e550 Plug In Hybrid
The SAIC Roewe 550 PHEV is the plug-in hybrid version. Retails sales began in China in November 2013.

Cumulative sales totaled 11,711 units through December 2015, of which 10,711 were sold throughout 2015.

MG 550
In 2008, the Roewe 550 was launched in Chile, rebadged as the MG 550. It was also released in Iran in 2010 and released in Bahrain, Oman and UAE in 2011. A restyled hatchback version of the Roewe 550 was announced at the 2009 Shanghai Auto Show as the MG 6. The MG6 was imported into the United Kingdom up until May 2016, when it was discontinued following poor sales.

References

External links
MG 550 Website 
Roewe Website 

Compact cars
550
Cars introduced in 2008
2010s cars
Roewe 550 PHEV
Cars of China